Bayraklı is a village in the Batman District of Batman Province in Turkey. The village is populated by Kurds of the Reşkotan tribe and had a population of 574 in 2021.

The hamlets of Selamet and Yoğurtlu are attached to the village.

References 

Villages in Batman District
Kurdish settlements in Batman Province